Piggie Pie! is a 1995 children's picture book by Margie Palatini and illustrated by Howard Fine.

Plot
Gritch the Witch wants to make one of her favorite meals - piggie pie - but she lacks the crucial ingredients of piggies. Heading to Old McDonald's Farm she attempts to find some piggies, but is foiled when the pigs dress up as various barnyard creatures and even Old McDonald. Foiled, she stumbles upon the Big Bad Wolf and the two head to Gritch's house each thinking they will eat the other for lunch.

Reception
Ann A. Flowers, of Horn Book Magazine reviewed the book saying, "Extremely amusing and certain to be appreciated by young listeners of the more robust sort". Dawn Friedman, of Common Sense Media reviewed the book saying "With sly tributes to at least three popular kids stories (Wizard of Oz, Old MacDonald, and The Three Little Pigs), this is sure to be a popular read-aloud — and with adult help, kids can get in on the jokes, too". 

It was the 1998 winner of the Bill Martin Jr. Picture Book Award of the Kansas Reading Association. Piggie Pie is ranked number 37 on the 2007 National Education Association list of "Teachers' Top 100 Books for Children."

Nominations & awards
1998-1999 Buckaroo Book Award nominee
1998 Bill Martin Jr. Picture Book Award
 1998 Golden Sower Award nominee
1998 CRYM Award nominee
1997-1998 Black-Eyed Susan Book Award
1997-1998 Young Hoosier Award Nominee for K-3
1997 Mockingbird Award Winner
1997 Kentucky Bluegrass Award
1997 Red Clover Award
1997 Colorado Children's Book Award Winner

References

External links
South Carolina Association of School Librarians 2008 suggested reading list
"Margie Palatini" (paragraph 1) "...the now perennial favorite Piggie Pie!, published in 1995..."

American picture books
1995 children's books
Clarion Books books